The 2013–14 South Dakota State Jackrabbits men's basketball team represented South Dakota State University during the 2013–14 NCAA Division I men's basketball season. The Jackrabbits, led by 19th year head coach Scott Nagy, played their home games at Frost Arena and were members of The Summit League. They finished the season 19–13, 10–4 in The Summit League play to finish in a tie for second place. They advanced to the semifinals of The Summit League tournament where they lost to IPFW. They were invited to the College Basketball Invitational where they lost in the first round to Old Dominion.

Roster

Schedule

|-
!colspan=9 style="background:#003896; color:#F7D417;"| Exhibition

|-
!colspan=9 style="background:#003896; color:#F7D417;"| Regular season

|-
!colspan=9 style="background:#003896; color:#F7D417;"| The Summit League tournament

|-
!colspan=9 style="background:#003896; color:#F7D417;"| CBI

* The January 3 game vs. Buffalo was postponed due to inclement weather in the Northeast. The game was not rescheduled.

References

South Dakota State Jackrabbits men's basketball seasons
South Dakota State
South Dakota State
South Dakota State Jackrabbits men's basketball
South Dakota State Jackrabbits men's basketball